Kim Clijsters and Laurence Courtois were the defending champions, but neither competed this year.

Karina Habšudová and Daniela Hantuchová won the title, after Petra Mandula and Patricia Wartusch were forced to withdraw before the final.

Seeds

Draw

Draw

References

External links
 Official results archive (ITF)
 Official results archive (WTA)

WTA Bratislava
2000 in Slovak sport